Hasnarud (also Romanized as Ḩasnārūd, Ḩasnā Rūd, Ḩosnārūd, and Ḩasanā Rūd; also known as Hasanrūd) is a village in Neyasar Rural District, Neyasar District, Kashan County, Isfahan Province, Iran. At the 2006 census, its population was 582, in 172 families.

References 

Populated places in Kashan County